Frederick George Ewington (27 May 1844 – 27 June 1922) was a New Zealand soldier, estate agent, philanthropist and pamphleteer . He was born in Barnet, Hertfordshire, England on 27 May 1844.

References

1844 births
1922 deaths
New Zealand philanthropists
New Zealand military personnel